Double Pipe Creek, sometimes called Pipe Creek, is a major tributary of the Monocacy River in Carroll County and Frederick County in Maryland, located several miles north and west of Westminster.

Course
The creek's watershed extends as far east as Manchester, Maryland, and includes the towns of Union Bridge, Taneytown, New Windsor and Westminster.

Tributaries include Bear Branch, Big Pipe Creek, Little Pipe Creek, Meadow Branch and Sam's Creek. Double Pipe Creek, the portion of Little Pipe Creek west of Union Bridge, and the western section of Sam's Creek form part of the legal boundary between Frederick County and Carroll County.

Pollution
The Maryland Department of the Environment (MDE) has identified water quality violations for Double Pipe Creek and tributaries, specifically for sediment, nutrients (nitrogen and phosphorus), and bacteria.  The principal sources of bacteria appear to be failing septic tanks from residences and/or businesses, pet waste and waste from farm animals (livestock). The pollution sources for sediment include agricultural runoff and urban runoff. (Although agriculture is the predominant land use in the watershed, tributaries of Double Pipe Creek flow through portions of Westminster, Taneytown, New Windsor and Union Bridge.)

Proposed Union Mills Reservoir
See Union Mills Reservoir

Since the 1970s, Carroll County commissioners have been proposing a dam or reservoir, defeated in 1976 by petition and raised again under the title of a proposed Union Mills Reservoir.

History
Before the battle broke out at Gettysburg, General Meade had planned a defensive position for the Army of the Potomac at Pipe Creek, making use of its broad slopes and open fields of fire. In the alternate history Gettysburg, by Gingrich and Forstchen, General Lee seizes Pipe Creek as his defensive line.

See also
List of Maryland rivers

References

External links
Monocacy & Catoctin Watershed Alliance

Rivers of Carroll County, Maryland
Rivers of Frederick County, Maryland
Rivers of Maryland
Tributaries of the Monocacy River